HU or Hu may refer to:

Arts and entertainment 
 Hu Sanniang, a fictional character in the Water Margin, one of the Four Great Classical Novels of Chinese literature
 Tian Hu, one of the antagonists in the Water Margin
 Hollywood Undead, an American rap rock band
 The Hu, a Mongolian heavy metal band

Language
 Hu (digraph), used primarily in Classical Nahuatl
 Fu (kana), also romanised as Hu, Japanese kana ふ and フ
 Hu language, of Yunnan, China
 Hungarian language (ISO 639 alpha-2 code 'hu')

Mythology and religion 
 Hu (mythology), the deification of the first word in the Egyptian mythology of the Ennead
 Huh (god), the deification of eternity in the Egyptian mythology of the Ogdoad
 Hu (Sufism), a name for God
 Hu (ritual baton), an early Chinese writing utensil later used in Daoist rituals
 Hú, a kachina in Hopi mythology
 Adir Hu, a hymn sung at the Passover Seder
 Hu Gadarn (or Hu the Mighty), a Welsh legendary figure
 HU, a mantra popularized by the religion Eckankar as a name for and love song to God

People 
 Hu (singer), an Italian singer-songwriter
 Hu (surname), a Chinese family name represented by the character 胡
 Any peoples in Chinese history translated as "barbarian" in English:
Donghu people

Places 
 Shanghai, abbreviated Hù (沪/滬), the largest city in China
 Hu County, in Xi'an, Shaanxi, China
 Huy, Walloon name Hu, Belgian city
 Hu, Egypt, the modern name of an Egyptian town on the Nile, which in more ancient times was the capital of the 7th Nome of Upper Egypt
 Hanau, Germany, on vehicle registration plates 
 Huesca, Spain, on vehicle registration plates
 Hungary, from it ISO 3166-1 alpha-2 country code
 HU postcode area, covering Hull and areas of East Riding of Yorkshire

Universities

United States
 Hamline University in St. Paul, Minnesota, United States
 Hampton University a private, historically black university in Hampton, Virginia, United States
 Harding University in Searcy, Arkansas, United States
 Harrisburg University of Science and Technology a private research university located in Harrisburg, Pennsylvania, United States
 Harvard University in Cambridge, Massachusetts, United States
 Hofstra University in New York, United States
 Hollins University in Roanoke, Virginia, United States
 Howard University in Washington DC, United States
 Husson University in Bangor, Maine, United States

Other countries
 Habib University in Karachi, Sindh, Pakistan
 Haigazian University in Beirut, Lebanon
 Hajvery University in Lahore, Punjab, Pakistan
 Hamdard University in Karachi, Sindh, Pakistan
 Hashemite University in Zarqa, Jordan
 Hazara University in Mansehra, Khyber Pakhtunkhwa, Pakistan
 Helwan University, the largest university in Egypt
 Henan University in Kaifeng, Henan, China
 HITEC University in Taxila, Punjab, Pakistan
 Humboldt University of Berlin in Berlin, Germany
 Hunan University in Changsha, Hunan, China
 Hongik University in South Korea
 HU University of Applied Sciences Utrecht, the Netherlands

Other uses
 .hu, the Internet country code top-level domain for Hungary
 Hu (vessel), a type of ancient Chinese bronze vessel
 Hainan Airlines (IATA airline code HU)
 Holographic Universe, in quantum gravity and string theories
 Hounsfield Units, on the Hounsfield scale, a unit of measurement used on a computed tomography machine (CAT)
 HU, a bacterial histone-like DNA-binding protein
 Wu Hu (disambiguation), an ancient Chinese term for multiple groups in China
 Halo: Uprising, a comic book series

See also
 Hoo (disambiguation)
 Who (disambiguation)
 Huh (disambiguation)

ca:Llista de personatges de la mitologia egípcia#H